Yogeshwar Dutt (born 2 November 1982) is an Indian freestyle wrestler. At the 2012 Summer Olympics, he won the bronze medal in the 60 kg category. He was awarded the Padma Shri by the Government of India in 2013. He won gold medals at the 2010 and the 2014 Commonwealth Games. He is one of only 5 male wrestlers in India to win an Olympic medal.

Early life
Dutt was born in Bhainswal Kalan village in Sonipat district of Haryana. He first started wrestling at the age of eight in his native village and idolised Balraj Pehlwan. He was trained by coach Ramphal.

Career

2006 Asian Games 
Yogeshwar had lost his father on 3 August 2006 just nine days before he boarded the flight to Doha for the Asian Games. He also sustained a knee injury, but despite all the emotional and physical trauma he managed to win the bronze in the 60 kg category at the 15th Asian Games at Doha.

2010 Commonwealth Games 
At the 2010 Delhi Commonwealth Games, Yogeshwar overcame a career-threatening knee injury to win the 60 kg title. Yogeshwar, who went past Australian Farzad Tarash (16–0, 17–0), South African Marius Loots (7–1) and England's Sasha Madyarchyk (4–4, 8–0) on his way to the final, came up with an exceptionally skilful performance to win the gold for India.

2012 Summer Olympics 
On 12 August 2012, Yogeshwar Dutt provided a late boost to India's medals tally in the 2012 London Olympics by claiming a memorable bronze in the Men's freestyle 60 kg, thus becoming the third Indian wrestler to win an Olympic medal after K D Jadhav in 1952 and Sushil Kumar in 2008 and 2012.

He had defeated North Korean Ri Jong-Myong in the bronze medal bout thus winning the fifth medal for Indian contingent at the London Olympics 2012.

Earlier, Yogeshwar qualified for the 2012 Olympics by winning a silver medal at an Asian qualification tournament in Astana, Kazakhstan where he lost to Iranian Masoud Esmaeilpour (2–3, 0–1) in the final.

At the Olympics he lost to the Russian B Kudukhov 1–0, 2–0 and was knocked out from the pre-quarterfinal round. He got a chance to contest in the repechage rounds as Kudukhov reached the finals of the event.

In his first repechage round he went on to beat Franklin Gómez of Puerto Rico with a score of 1–0, 1–0. He got lucky against his opponent, winning the toss on both the occasions to earn a clinch position. Yogeshwar then scored 7–5 to beat Masoud Esmaeilpour with an aggregate of counted points 3–1 in Repechage Round 2. Esmaeilpour had beaten Yogeshwar at the Asian qualifications earlier that year.

He finally beat his North Korean opponent to clinch the bronze medal (0–1, 1–0, 6–0). He was exceptional in the last round, and clinched it in just 1:02 minutes.

2014 Commonwealth Games 

Yogeshwar Dutt won the gold medal in the men's 65 kg freestyle category by beating Canada's Jevon Balfour 10–0 in the finals.

Yogeshwar had earlier beaten Alex Gladkov of Scotland 4–0 in the pre-quarters and then easily defeated another Scottish wrestler Gareth Jones in the quarterfinals by employing his trademark Fitele (leg twisting) technique that he had used while winning the bronze medal at the 2012 London Olympics. In the semi-finals, Yogeshwar successfully used his favourite technique again to get the better of Sri Lanka's Chamara Perera in just two minutes and three seconds. Yogeshwar won with a 0–5 verdict after taking a 10–0 lead on technical points.

2014 Asian Games 

Yogeshwar Dutt won the Gold in the 65 kg freestyle wrestling category by defeating Zalimkhan Yusupov of Tajikistan in the final at the Asian games 2014. Dutt won a closely fought final 1–0. Earlier, he defeated the opponent from China in the semi-final by Fall in another closely fought bout in which Dutt was trailing almost until the end. He defeated Jinhyok Kang of North Korea in the quarterfinal.

2015 
In 2015, he was clubbed into the ‘Icon’ category by Haryana Hammers– one of the six teams playing under the first edition of Pro Wrestling League (PWL), which was held from 10 to 27 December in six Indian cities.

Political career
Dutt joined Bharatiya Janata Party in September 2019.

Awards, rewards and recognition 
 Rajiv Gandhi Khel Ratna Award 2012 given by Government of India

 For the bronze medal at 2012 London Olympic
  cash reward from the Haryana Government.
 4x4 vehicle from a PSU bank

See also 
 India at the 2012 Summer Olympics

References

External links 
 
 
 
 
 

1982 births
Living people
Olympic wrestlers of India
Wrestlers at the 2004 Summer Olympics
Wrestlers at the 2008 Summer Olympics
Wrestlers at the 2012 Summer Olympics
Wrestlers at the 2016 Summer Olympics
Indian male sport wrestlers
Wrestlers at the 2010 Commonwealth Games
Commonwealth Games gold medallists for India
Olympic bronze medalists for India
Sport wrestlers from Haryana
Asian Games medalists in wrestling
Olympic medalists in wrestling
Recipients of the Khel Ratna Award
Wrestlers at the 2006 Asian Games
Recipients of the Padma Shri in sports
Medalists at the 2012 Summer Olympics
Wrestlers at the 2014 Commonwealth Games
Wrestlers at the 2014 Asian Games
Asian Games gold medalists for India
Asian Games bronze medalists for India
People from Sonipat district
Commonwealth Games medallists in wrestling
Medalists at the 2006 Asian Games
Medalists at the 2014 Asian Games
Bharatiya Janata Party politicians from Haryana
Recipients of the Arjuna Award
Asian Wrestling Championships medalists
Indian sports executives and administrators
20th-century Indian people
21st-century Indian people
Medallists at the 2010 Commonwealth Games
Medallists at the 2014 Commonwealth Games